SS Aztec was an American Cargo ship during the late 19th and early 20th centuries. On 1 April 1917 she was torpedoed by German submarine SM U-46 off of the northwest coast of France.

History 
SS Aztec was built in 1894 by Edwards & Sons Shipbuilding Co in Howdon-On-Tyone at the request of the Pacific Mail Steamship Company. She ran regular routes between San Francisco, Honolulu, and Shanghai. She departed New York City in March 1917 with a cargo of copper, steel, lumber, machinery and chemicals bound for the port of Le Havre. On 1 April 1917 she was torpedoed off the coast of Ushant in France by the German Uboat SM U-46. 28 passengers were killed, including 10 American crew members. News of her sinking was relayed to Washington by the American embassy in Paris on 2 April, followed by a secondary report on the sinking on 4 April. The news of the torpedoing of the Aztec was passed on to the United States Congress as deliberations were ongoing as to the declaration for war on Germany, as President Woodrow Wilson had asked congress to declare war on Germany on 2 April.

To commemorate the centennial of Aztec's sinking, the Hawaii World War I Centennial Task Force held a ceremony for the lost crew of the ship on 3 April 2017.

References 

Merchant ships of the United States
1894 ships